Miroslav Duga (29 January 1989 in Myjava) is a Slovak footballer who plays as a defender for the Corgoň Liga club TJ Spartak Myjava.

External links
 at official club website 

1989 births
Living people
Slovak footballers
FK Dubnica players
Slovak Super Liga players
Association football defenders
Spartak Myjava players
People from Myjava
Sportspeople from the Trenčín Region